Franky Vanhooren (born 27 October 1963) is a Belgian short track speed skater. He competed in the men's 5000 metre relay event at the 1992 Winter Olympics.

References

1963 births
Living people
Belgian male short track speed skaters
Olympic short track speed skaters of Belgium
Short track speed skaters at the 1992 Winter Olympics
Sportspeople from Bruges